Phyllonorycter acerifoliella is a moth of the family Gracillariidae. It is found from Sweden to the Pyrenees, Italy, Albania and Bulgaria, and from Great Britain to southern Russia.

The wingspan is about 8 mm. Adults are on wing in May and August in two generations in western Europe.

The larvae feed on field maple (Acer campestre) and Tatar maple (Acer tataricum), mining the leaves of their host plant. They create a relatively small, lower surface tentiform mine which is often located under a leaf segment. During development, the mine contracts and this segment usually folds down, covering the mine. The pupa is dark (black to brown) and made in a cocoon that is attached to the floor of the mine.

References

External links
 

acerifoliella
Moths described in 1839
Moths of Asia
Moths of Europe
Taxa named by Philipp Christoph Zeller